Roosevelt "Roosie" Hudson  (July 15, 1915 – February 1, 1985) was an American professional basketball player. He played for the Chicago Studebaker Flyers in the National Basketball League for one season. He also played for the Harlem Globetrotters for a total of seven seasons.

References

1915 births
1985 deaths
United States Army personnel of World War II
Basketball players from Mississippi
Chicago Studebaker Flyers players
Guards (basketball)
Harlem Globetrotters players
Morris Brown College alumni
American men's basketball players